Drishyam may refer to:
Drishyam, a 2013 Malayalam-language film
Drishyam 2, a Malayalam-language sequel in 2021 
Drushyam, a 2014 Telugu-language remake of the 2013 film
Drushyam 2, a 2021 Telugu-language remake of 2021 film & a sequel of the Telugu 2014 film
Drishya, a 2014 Kannada-language remake of the 2013 film
Drishyam (2015 film), a Hindi-language remake of the 2013 film
Drishyam 2 (2022 film), a Hindi-language sequel of the 2015 film
Dharmayuddhaya, a 2017 Sinhala-language independent remake of 2013 film
Drishyam Films, an independent Indian film production company